Pamphiliidae (sometimes incorrectly spelled Pamphilidae) is a small wasp family within Symphyta, containing some 200 species from the temperate regions of North America and Eurasia. The larvae feed on plants (often conifers), using silk to build webs or tents, or to roll leaves into tubes in which they feed, thus earning them the common names leaf-rolling sawflies or web-spinning sawflies.  Some species are gregarious and the larvae live in large groups. Fossils of Pamphiliidae have been dated to the Jurassic period.

They are distinguished from the closely related Megalodontesidae by their simple, filiform antennae.

Taxonomy
The family is currently divided into three subfamilies based on phylogenetic analysis of both extant and extinct species.
Cephalciinae Benson, 1945
Acantholyda Costa, 1894
Caenolyda Konow, 1897
Cephalcia Panzer, 1805
Chinolyda Beneš, 1968
Juralydinae
†Atocus Scudder, 1892
†Juralyda Rasnitsyn, 1977
Neurotoma Konow, 1897
†Scabolyda Wang et al, 2014
†Tapholyda Rasnitsyn, 1983
Pamphiliinae Cameron, 1890
Chrysolyda Shinohara, 2002
Kelidoptera Konow, 1897
Onycholyda Takeuchi, 1938
Pamphilius Latreille, 1802
Pseudocephaleia Zirngiebl, 1937
Incertae sedis
†Ulteramus  Archibald & Rasnitsyn, 2015

References

Borror, D. J., DeLong, D. M., Triplehorn, C. A.(1976) cuarta edición. An introduction to the study of insects. Holt, Rinehart and Winston. New York, Chicago.

External links 
 Bugguide.net. Family Pamphiliidae - Webspinning and Leafrolling Sawflies

Sawfly families